German submarine U-1064 was a Type VIIC/41 U-boat built for Nazi Germany's Kriegsmarine for service during World War II.
She was laid down on 23 September 1943 by Friedrich Krupp Germaniawerft, Kiel as yard number 701, launched on 22 June 1944 and commissioned on 29 July 1944 under Korvettenkapitän Karl-Hermann Schneidewind.

Design
German Type VIIC/41 submarines were preceded by the heavier Type VIIC submarines. U-1064 had a displacement of  when at the surface and  while submerged. She had two shafts and two  propellers.

U-1064 was fitted with five  torpedo tubes (four fitted at the bow and one at the stern), fourteen torpedoes, one  SK C/35 naval gun, (220 rounds), one  Flak M42 and two  C/30 anti-aircraft guns. The boat had a complement of between forty-four and sixty.

Service history
The boat's service career began on 29 July 1944 with the 5th Training Flotilla, followed by active service with 11th Flotilla on 1 February 1945. U-1064 surrendered on 9 May 1945 at Trondheim, Norway. Postwar, she was transferred to the Soviet Navy as S-83, where she served until 12 March 1974. She was eventually broken up for scrap.

Summary of raiding history

See also
 Battle of the Atlantic

References

Bibliography

German Type VIIC/41 submarines
U-boats commissioned in 1944
World War II submarines of Germany
1944 ships
Ships built in Kiel
Foreign submarines of the Soviet Navy